The 1974 E3 Harelbeke was the 17th edition of the E3 Harelbeke cycle race and was held on 23 March 1974. The race started and finished in Harelbeke. The race was won by Herman Van Springel.

General classification

References

1974 in Belgian sport
1974
1974 in road cycling